Huang Pei-jia is a Taiwanese actress.

Filmography

Film

Television series

Awards and nominations

References

External links

 
 

1988 births
21st-century Taiwanese actresses
Living people
Taiwanese film actresses
Taiwanese television actresses